"Heaven Coming Down" is a song by Canadian rock band The Tea Party. It was released as a single in Australia and France and as a promotional single in Canada. "Heaven Coming Down" is The Tea Party's sole number-one single in Canada, reaching the top of the RPM Rock Report. The song was nominated for "Best Single" at the 2000 Juno Awards.

Content
It is a rock composition of heavy drums, chiming 12-string Rickenbacker guitar with bass and keyboard accompaniment.

Track listing 
"Heaven Coming Down"
"Save Me"
"Fire in the Head"
"Temptation"

Charts

References

External links

1999 singles
The Tea Party songs
1999 songs
EMI Records singles